Oenocarpus distichus is a species of palm, commonly in the southeast of the Amazonia.  It is distinguished from turu palm by the notorial appearance of its opposite leaves.

Uses 
In Brazil, the palm has been used by indigenous people since ancient times.  A thick wine is prepared with the kneaded mesocarp juice, highly appreciated locally. The pulp of the fruits contains 25% oil (10% of the weight of the whole fruit) and produces a light yellow oil.

References

External links 

Flora of Brazil
distichus